Deuterated ethanol (C2D5OD)  is a form (called an isotopologue) of ethanol (C2H5OH) in which the hydrogen atom ("H") is replaced with deuterium (heavy hydrogen) isotope ("D"). Deuterated ethanol is an uncommon solvent used in NMR spectroscopy.

References 

Deuterated solvents
Ethanol